Shravana is the 22nd nakshatra (Devanagari नक्षत्र) or lunar mansion as used in Hindu astronomy, Hindu calendar and Hindu astrology. It belongs to the constellation Makara (Devanagari: मकर), a legendary sea creature resembling a crocodile] or Capricorn. The name alludes to Shravan, a mythological character who attained repute due to his utmost devotion to his aged and blind parents.

Lord Venkateswara of Tirupati and Lord Oppiliappan near Kumbakonam, who married Markandeya Rishi's daughter Bhuvalli, were born in this Nakshatra in the Bhadrapada maasa. 

Traditional Hindu given names are determined by which pada (quarter) of a nakshatra the Ascendant/Lagna was in at the time of birth. In the case of Shravana Nakshatra, the given name would begin with the following syllables:

Khi (Devanagari: खी)
Khu (Devanagari: खू)
Khe (Devanagari: खे)
Kho (Devanagari: खो)

References

Nakshatra